This list contains general information about computer system on chips (SOCs) developed by Ambarella.

System on chips

References 

Ambarella